Lynda Mary Folauhola (born 6 October 1980), also known as Lynda Dackiw, is a former Australian diver. In 2003, partnered with Loudy Tourky, she finished with a silver medal at the 2003 World Aquatics Championships. Again paired with Tourky, she competed at the 2004 Summer Olympics in the synchronised 10 metre platform event where the duo finished 4th. She also took part in the 1998 Commonwealth Games.

References

External links

1980 births
Living people
Australian female divers
Divers at the 1998 Commonwealth Games
Divers at the 2004 Summer Olympics
Olympic divers of Australia
World Aquatics Championships medalists in diving
Sportspeople from Adelaide
Sportswomen from South Australia
Commonwealth Games competitors for Australia
20th-century Australian women
21st-century Australian women